Sven-Olof Sällström (born 4 October 1968) is a Swedish politician who has been a member of the Riksdag for the Sweden Democrats since 2010.

Sällström originally worked as a store manager before his political career. He was a member of the Centre Party and the Liberals before joining the Sweden Democrats in 2006. He unsuccessfully stood for the party during the 2009 European Parliament elections before he was elected to the Riksdag during the 2010 Swedish general election. In 2012, he succeeded Erik Almqvist as the Sweden Democrats' economic spokesperson after Almqvist was forced to resign as a result of the so-called iron pipe scandal. He held the position until 2014 when Oscar Sjöstedt succeeded him.

References 

Living people
1968 births
Members of the Riksdag from the Sweden Democrats
People from Västernorrland County
Members of the Riksdag 2010–2014
Members of the Riksdag 2014–2018
Members of the Riksdag 2018–2022
Members of the Riksdag 2022–2026
21st-century Swedish politicians